In mathematics the synchrotron functions are defined as follows (for x ≥ 0):

 First synchrotron function

 Second synchrotron function

where Kj is the modified Bessel function of the second kind.

Use in astrophysics 

In astrophysics, x is usually a ratio of frequencies, that is, the frequency over a critical frequency (critical frequency is the frequency at which most synchrotron radiation is radiated).  This is needed when calculating the spectra for different types of synchrotron emission.  It takes a spectrum of electrons (or any charged particle) generated by a separate process (such as a power law distribution of electrons and positrons from a constant injection spectrum) and converts this to the spectrum of photons generated by the input electrons/positrons.

References

Further reading 

Special functions